WJDX-FM (105.1 MHz) is a mainstream urban radio station licensed to Kosciusko, Mississippi, but located in Jackson, Mississippi. It is owned by iHeartMedia, Inc. (formerly Clear Channel Communications until September 2014). From October 1998 to March 2003 WQJQ was a Jammin' Oldies station.  Its studios are located in northwest Jackson, and its transmitter site is east of Canton.

On January 24, 2011, WQJQ relaunched as "Oldies 105.1" and in the process changed its call letters to WJDX-FM. The original WJDX-FM call letters were on a progressive rock station at 102.9 (now WMSI-FM) from the late 1960s through the early 1970s. The station changed its calls to WZZQ in 1973 and would evolve from progressive rock to a locally produced AOR music format.

WJDX-FM's oldies format includes some of the songs that were popular on WJDX (AM) when that station played Top 40 music during the 1970s.

In November 2013, WJDX-FM flipped to its usual Christmas music format for the holidays. However, it changed its name to "FM 105.1: The Christmas Station," possibly meaning a change coming after the holidays. On December 26, 2013 WJDX-FM rebranded as "105.1 The River" and became a classic hits station (playing the hits of the 1960s, 1970s and 1980s).

On September 1, 2014, the station ditched 1960s music to fully concentrate on 1970s and especially 1980s music.  The station even had a slogan indicative of the change: "Jackson's Greatest Hits of the '70s and '80s."

On February 11, 2019, the station made the switch from classic hits to adult hits (but still heavily concentrated on 1980s music).  Since then, the station's slogan has been "Jackson's Greatest Hits of the '80s and More."

On May 22, 2020, at noon, after stunting with music from different genres, WJDX flipped to urban, branding itself as “Real 105.1”.

References

External links
WJDX-FM website

JDX-FM
IHeartMedia radio stations
Mainstream urban radio stations in the United States